State Road 700 (SR 700) is the mostly unsigned Florida Department of Transportation state road designation of U.S. Route 98 (US 98) between Chassahowitzka (where US 98 continues northward as unsigned SR 55) and Twentymile Bend (where US 98 continues eastward as signed SR 80). The only segments of State Road 700 that are signed are between SR 50A and US 41 in Brooksville, and from Okeechobee south, through Canal Point, to SR 80. From the northernmost signed point, it's an unsigned concurrency with SR 45(US 41), then with SR 50, before rejoining US 98 at the west end of the US 98/SR 50 concurrency.  The section between Canal Point to SR 80 is signed only as State Road 700 since the relocating of US 98 to run concurrent with US 441 in Palm Beach County.

Cities served by US 98/SR 700 include:

Brooksville
Dade City
Lakeland
Bartow
Fort Meade
Avon Park
Sebring
Okeechobee
Canal Point

A  extension of SR 700 in Palm Beach County to County Road 880 (CR 880) is known as County Road 700.

Major intersections

Spur in Brooksville

References

External links

700
700
700
700
700
700
700
700
700